Ghabi Issa Khouri (born 17 September 1960) is a Lebanese athlete. He competed in the men's long jump at the 1984 Summer Olympics.

References

1960 births
Living people
Athletes (track and field) at the 1984 Summer Olympics
Lebanese male long jumpers
Olympic athletes of Lebanon
Place of birth missing (living people)